Lai da Ova Spin is a compensation reservoir on the Spöl river at Zernez, Grisons, Switzerland. Its volume is 7.4 mio m³ and surface area .

The arch dam Ova Spin was completed in 1968 and has a height of 73 m.

See also
List of lakes of Switzerland
List of mountain lakes of Switzerland

External links
Swiss dams: Ova Spin
Engadiner Kraftwerke AG

Reservoirs in Switzerland
Lakes of Graubünden
Arch dams
Zernez